Qingshanpu Town is a town in Changsha County, Changsha, Hunan Province, China. It administers seven villages and one community.

Divisions of Changsha County
Changsha County